Mohit Raut (born 20 January 1998) is an Indian cricketer. He made his Twenty20 debut on 15 January 2021, for Vidarbha in the 2020–21 Syed Mushtaq Ali Trophy.

References

External links
 

1998 births
Living people
Indian cricketers
Vidarbha cricketers
Place of birth missing (living people)